Ablainzevelle is a commune in the Pas-de-Calais department in northern France.

Geography
A small farming village located 11 miles (18 km) south of Arras, at the D7 and D12 road junction. It was rebuilt after being destroyed during World War I.

Population

Sights
 The church of Notre-Dame, dating from the twentieth century.

See also
Communes of the Pas-de-Calais department

References

Communes of Pas-de-Calais